Bo Svensson (born 4 August 1979) is a Danish professional football coach and a former defender. He is currently managing Mainz 05.

He has played three games for the Denmark national football team.

Playing career
Svensson was born in Skørping, Northern Jutland. He started playing youth football with Copenhagen club Kjøbenhavns Boldklub (KB), the reserve team of F.C. Copenhagen (FCK). He was moved from KB into the FCK squad in June 1999, and got his FCK debut in September 1999, under FCK manager Kim Brink. He was soon a FCK regular team member, and was called up for the Danish under-21 national team in March 2000.

With FCK, he won the 2001 Danish Superliga championship under manager Roy Hodgson, and the 2003 Superliga under manager Hans Backe. When FCK team captain Peter Nielsen retired in winter 2003, Bo Svensson was given the captain's armband. He went on to captain FCK when they won the Double, of both 2004 Superliga and Danish Cup titles. The 2004–05 season was less successful, but FCK managed to win the inaugural 2005 Royal League tournament. In the summer break 2005, Hans Backe demoted Svensson to vice-captain, as the captain status was given to the Swedish international midfielder Tobias Linderoth. With his FCK contract running out one year later, in the summer 2006, Svensson looked for a new club, and left FCK in the winter break 2005. He played a total of 196 official games for FCK.

He moved abroad when he was sold to German team Borussia Mönchengladbach (M'gladbach) in January 2006. He debuted for Mönchengladbach in February 2006 and finished the season playing 13 of Mönchengladbach's last 15 games, under manager Horst Köppel. He was called up for the Danish national team, and made his debut in May 2006, under national manager Morten Olsen.

In summer 2007 he was transferred to Mainz 05. After the 2013–14 season he retired from professional football.

Coaching career
After retiring from professional football, Svensson started his coaching career as an assistant coach for his old club, Mainz 05. In June 2015 he became a youth coach for the club. In 2017 Svensson took over the under 19 squad of Mainz.

In 2019, he became the head coach of FC Liefering in the 2. Liga in Austria. The team is known for being a feeder club for Austrian side FC Red Bull Salzburg. Under his leadership, the young team finished the 2019–20 season in third place. They also, were successful in the beginning of the 2020–21 season, being in second place after 13 games.

On 4 January 2021 Svensson became the new head coach of his former club Mainz 05 in the Bundesliga.

Managerial statistics

Honours
Danish Superliga: 2001, 2003, 2004 and 2006
Danish Cup: 2004
Royal League: 2005 and 2006

References

External links

Danish national team profile 

Complete League statistics at danskfodbold.com 

1979 births
Living people
People from Rebild Municipality
Expatriate footballers in Germany
Danish men's footballers
F.C. Copenhagen players
Borussia Mönchengladbach players
1. FSV Mainz 05 players
Denmark international footballers
Denmark under-21 international footballers
Danish expatriate men's footballers
Danish Superliga players
Bundesliga players
2. Bundesliga players
Danish people of Swedish descent
Association football defenders
FC Liefering managers
1. FSV Mainz 05 managers
Danish expatriate football managers
Danish expatriate sportspeople in Austria
Danish expatriate sportspeople in Germany
Expatriate football managers in Austria
Expatriate football managers in Germany
Association football coaches
Sportspeople from the North Jutland Region